The City Girl is a 1984 film directed by Martha Coolidge.  The film was produced in 1982, but not completed until 1984. The Film screened at BERLINALE in 1984, but has never received an official release.

Plot

A female photographer who is engaged to a businessman investigates a cult in the local club scene. By living out some of her sexual fantasies, she faces the truth about her life and helps one of the cult's victims escape.

Principal cast

References

External links 
 
 

1984 films
1984 drama films
1980s English-language films
Films shot in Toronto
Films directed by Martha Coolidge
Canadian drama films
English-language Canadian films
1980s Canadian films